Edward Trail Helfenstein (April 7, 1865 – December 22, 1947)  was the eighth bishop of the Episcopal Diocese of Maryland, serving in that capacity from 1929 till 1943.

Early life and education
Helfenstein was born on April 7, 1865 in St. Louis, Missouri, the son of Cyrus Glonigan Helfenstein and Annie Elizabeth Trail. He was baptised in All Saints Church, Frederick, Maryland. He attended the Frederick Academy in Frederick, Maryland and then the Episcopal High School of Virginia. He also studied for a time at the Johns Hopkins University and then graduated from Virginia Theological Seminary in 1889. He was also awarded a Doctor of Divinity 1916 by Virginia Theological Seminary.

Ordained Ministry
Helfenstein was ordained deacon on March 19, 1889 by Bishop William Paret of Maryland and then became deacon-in-charge of Christ Church in Rock Spring, Maryland and Holy Cross Church in The Rocks Harford County, Maryland. He was ordained priest on March 9, 1890 in Emmanuel Church, Baltimore, also by Bishop William Paret. Between 1889 and 1890, he served as rector of Saint Mark's parish, covering Frederick and Washington counties. Afterwards he became rector of Saint John's Church in Ellicott City, Maryland in 1900 and subsequently also rector of Saint Peter's Church in Ellicott City, Maryland, retaining both posts till 1920. He was then appointed Archdeacon of Maryland in 1920.

Bishop
Helfenstein was elected Coadjutor Bishop of Maryland during a diocesan convention held in Baltimore in 1926. He was consecrated on December 28, 1926 by Presiding Bishop and Bishop of Maryland John Gardner Murray. He then succeeded Murray as diocesan upon his death on October 3, 1929. He retired on November 1, 1943 and died on December 22, 1947 after a brief illness.

References

1865 births
1947 deaths
Episcopal High School (Alexandria, Virginia) alumni
Johns Hopkins University alumni
Virginia Theological Seminary alumni
Clergy from St. Louis
People from Frederick, Maryland
Episcopal bishops of Maryland